The Fire and the Flood Tour was the second major concert tour by Australian singer and songwriter Vance Joy, in support of his first debut studio album, Dream Your Life Away (2014). The tour began on January 13, 2016, in Vancouver, Canada and concluded on April 30, 2016, in Brisbane, Australia.

Background
In September 2015, during The 1989 World Tour by Taylor Swift, Joy announced that he would once again embark on a main act tour for the first half of 2016, confirming the first dates for Canada and the United States, where he would begin playing in Vancouver on January 13 and end in Boston on April 1, counting a total of 40 concerts for that leg of the tour. In addition, he reported that he was promoting "Straight into Your Arms" and "Fire and the Flood", the two new songs from the special edition of his first album, Dream Your Life Away (2014). Canadian band Reuben and the Dark, English singer Jamie Lawson, American singer Elle King and American indie band Blind Pilot was announced to be an opening act.

Joy first announced the Australia dates on November 26, 2015. The tour was scheduled to begin on April 23, 2016,	in Melbourne and end on April 30 in Brisbane, having as opening act the Australian band Holy Holy.

Critical response
The Fire and the Flood Tour was praised by critics, highlighting above all the voice and interpretation of Joy of his songs. Sylvia Borgo from Owl and Bear was positive towards Joy's performance, saying: "Joy made the audience swoon with his sweet and delicate voice" and "was perfectly charming throughout the night". Kelly Fox  of Front Row Report deemed "No part of the set list felt abrupt or forced, but rather fluid and natural". The website The Writer's Bloc appreciated Joy's ability to connect with her audiences, saying: "His incredible charisma and ability to speak to his audience are far from mundane. Each and every one of his songs beautifully tells of the desire, the longing, simply the sublime qualities of love  we  experience, yet cannot find the words to describe".

Reviewing the tour's Brisbane show, Drew Creighton from The North West Star highlighted that "His music had an energy to it and while his voice suffered at the extremes of his range, it made for a lively and almost fiery performance". Creighton also added that "Joy knows how to connect with his audience and his show is designed to help with that connection, with the lights almost entirely focused on him for the whole gig".

Set list
This set list is from the show on February 19, 2016, in Denver. It is not intended to represent all concerts for the tour.

 "Mess Is Mine"
 "Red Eye"
 "Winds of Change"
 "All I Ever Wanted"
 "Straight into Your Arms"
 "From Afar"
 "Wasted Time"
 "Play With Fire"
 "Emmylou"
 "Georgia"
 "Best That I Can"
 "Riptide"
 "You Can Call Me Al"  / "Cheerleader" 
Encore
 "My Kind Of Man" 
 "Fire and the Flood"

Shows

References

2016 concert tours
Vance Joy concert tours